Berdini is an Italian surname. Notable people with the surname include:

Albert Berdini of Sarteano (1385–1450), Franciscan friar and preacher
Massimo Berdini (born 1958), Italian footballer

See also
Bernini (surname)

Italian-language surnames